The 29th Golden Raspberry Awards, or Razzies, ceremony was held by the Golden Raspberry Award Foundation to honor the worst films the film industry had to offer in 2008. The ceremony was held at the Barnsdall Gallery Theatre in Hollywood, California on February 21, 2009. Nominations were announced on January 21, 2009. The Love Guru was the most nominated film of 2008, with seven. Award results were based on votes from approximately 650 journalists, cinema fans and film professionals from 20 countries. Awards were presented by John Wilson, the ceremony's founder. The Love Guru received the most awards, winning Worst Picture, Worst Actor, and Worst Screenplay. Paris Hilton received three awards, including Worst Actress for her work in The Hottie & the Nottie and Worst Supporting Actress for Repo! The Genetic Opera. Hilton matched the record number of awards received by an actor in a single year, set by Eddie Murphy the previous year at the 28th Golden Raspberry Awards for his roles in Norbit.

Pierce Brosnan received Worst Supporting Actor for his role in Mamma Mia!, and Indiana Jones and the Kingdom of the Crystal Skull received the award for Worst Prequel, Remake, Rip-off or Sequel. Uwe Boll received the Worst Director award for the films 1968 Tunnel Rats, In the Name of the King and Postal, and also received a special award for Worst Career Achievement.

Nominations were announced on January 21, 2009, one day before the 81st Academy Awards nominations, and according to Razzies tradition the ceremony itself also preceded the corresponding Academy Award function by one day. The most nominated film of 2008 was the box office bomb The Love Guru, with seven nominations. Paid members of the Golden Raspberry Award Foundation voted to determine the winners; individuals may become members of the foundation by visiting the organization's website at www.razzies.com. Award results were based on votes from approximately 650 journalists, cinema fans and professionals from the film industry. Voters were from 45 states in the United States and 19 other countries.

Ceremony
The ceremony opened with a musical number which parodied the song "Dancing Queen" from Mamma Mia! The Movie. Awards were presented by John Wilson, the ceremony's founder. Awardees received a gold spray-painted raspberry worth $4.97. The Love Guru received three awards: Worst Picture, Worst Actor and Worst Screenplay. Worst Picture was the last award given out at the ceremony. John Wilson did not agree with the voters' determination on The Love Guru, and after viewing the film again in preparation for the ceremony, said to the Associated Press: "A couple of things he did got me to laugh, and these days, two laughs in a comedy is a high ratio." "The main thing wrong with it is no one said to Myers that it wasn't funny. He managed to offend the entire Indian population and his investors," said Wilson in a statement in The Guardian. Wilson shredded a copy of The Love Guru at the awards ceremony.

Paris Hilton's acting roles brought her three awards: Worst Actress and as part of Worst Screen Couple (with either Christine Lakin or Joel David Moore) for her performance in The Hottie & the Nottie, and Worst Supporting Actress for her work in Repo! The Genetic Opera. Hilton matched the record number of awards received by an actor in a single year, set by Eddie Murphy the previous year at the 28th Golden Raspberry Awards; he received three awards from different categories for the multiple characters he played in Norbit. "She is the 21st century Zsa Zsa Gabor. She is famous for who she hangs out with. She's not famous for any talent she has yet exhibited. She may end up working with Uwe Boll. She could be the head vampire in 'BloodRayne 3'," said Wilson of Hilton's performances. Pierce Brosnan received Worst Supporting Actor for his role in Mamma Mia! The Movie. Award hosts Chip Dornell and Kelie McIver described Brosnan as "an actor who could not sing, should not sing and arguably did not sing, in a role he should not have accepted." The Steven Spielberg film Indiana Jones and the Kingdom of the Crystal Skull received the award for Worst Prequel, Remake, Rip-off or Sequel.

Uwe Boll received the Worst Director award for films 1968 Tunnel Rats, In the Name of the King and Postal. He also received a special award for Worst Career Achievement. Boll was dubbed by award organizers as "Germany's answer to Ed Wood", a reference to Plan 9 from Outer Space film director Ed Wood Boll sent a humorous videotaped speech from a mock set of Darfur, Sudan, stating he would not return because the Razzie awards had "ruined his life". Wilson commented to Agence France-Presse: "Uwe Boll is the world-class movie director – anything he does is awful. He was the overwhelming choice to receive our career achievement award."

Winners and nominees

Films with multiple nominations 
These films garnered multiple nominations:

See also

 2008 in film
 81st Academy Awards
 62nd British Academy Film Awards
 66th Golden Globe Awards
 15th Screen Actors Guild Awards

References

External links

 
 
 

Golden Raspberry Awards
Golden Raspberry Awards ceremonies
Golden Raspberry
2009 in American cinema
February 2009 events in the United States
Golden Raspberry